Laurindo Dilson Maria Aurélio (born 8 January 2000), commonly known as Depú, is an Angolan footballer who plays as a forward for Portuguese club Gil Vicente.

Club career
On 31 January 2023, Depú signed a three-and-a-half-year contract with Gil Vicente in Portugal.

Career statistics

Club

Notes

International

References

2001 births
People from Benguela
Living people
Angolan footballers
Angola international footballers
Association football forwards
Académica Petróleos do Lobito players
C.R. Caála players
G.D. Sagrada Esperança players
Gil Vicente F.C. players
Girabola players
Angolan expatriate footballers
Expatriate footballers in Portugal
Angolan expatriate sportspeople in Portugal
Angola A' international footballers
2022 African Nations Championship players